The North Carolina Green Party is a political party in the state of North Carolina, and the NC affiliate of the Green Party of the United States. It has officially qualified for ballot access  until 2020 statewide election. Since 2006, it has worked in collaboration with other organizations seeking to reform state election laws.

The state party has five chapters, which are located in the Charlotte, Triad, and Triangle metropolitan areas and the Eastern and Western areas of the state.

It is listed in The A to Z of the Green Movement, which was published in 2007.

The party ran four candidates in November, 2018, including state legislative and congressional races.

In August 2022, the North Carolina State Board of Elections voted to recognize the North Carolina Green Party as an official party in the state.

Electoral history

Presidential elections
The party ran a write-in campaign for former Georgia Congresswoman Cynthia McKinney for U.S. president in 2008. As only 158 votes for McKinney were reported, the party questioned the counting of the votes and if all were counted.

In 2016, the party came close to gaining statewide ballot access, closer than the other six new parties, but still fell short of getting the required number of signatures. The party, in collaboration with the Stein/Baraka presidential campaign, helped garner more write-in votes for Jill Stein than any presidential write-in candidate has ever received in North Carolina.

Local elections
In 2010, Richard Allen Weir (now known as Rachel Alayna Weir) of Pitt County ran as a Green write-in candidate for United States Senate.   

In 2013, Michael Zytkow ran for the Charlotte City Council seat representing District 4 as an independent with the Green Party's endorsement. Zytkow garnered 33% of the vote.

On June 22, 2017, the Western chapter of the party endorsed Dee Williams for Asheville City Council

In June 2018, NCGP nominated Keenen Altic to run in the Forsyth County Commissioner At-Large race and he accepted choosing to run as a Green. 'Speaking of his first time running in politics and the first time the Green Party has run in Forsyth County, Altic said, “Having 4,500 or more votes demonstrates that there is a certain viability to our message. We have at least 4,500 or more potential socialists ready to organize.”' At 4,756 votes he received 3.5% of the vote in a three-way race. Altic's campaign distributed about 5,000 leaflets and candidate cards.

Current issues
On August 18, 2017, the Party voiced support for removing Confederate monuments and statues of Robert E. Lee., in response to a recent Ku Klux Klan rally and counter protest in Durham resulting in a General Lee statue being torn down by vandals.

On August 23, 2018, the NC Green Party endorsed the 2018 National Prison Strike.

Personnel
The former chair of the party was Doug Stuber. In 2000, Stuber ran Ralph Nader's Green Party presidential campaign. As of 2019, the co-chairs for the party were Tony Ndege and Tommie James.

See also
List of State Green Parties
 North Carolina Libertarian Party
 North Carolina Socialist Party
 Political party strength in North Carolina
 Politics of North Carolina
 Government of North Carolina
 Elections in North Carolina
 Law of North Carolina
 List of politics by U.S. state

References

Political parties in North Carolina
Green Party of the United States by state
Organizations based in Charlotte, North Carolina
2005 establishments in North Carolina
Political parties established in 2005
State and local socialist parties in the United States